Deedee Magno Hall is an American actress and singer. She is best known for her work in the pop group The Party, and as the voice of Pearl in the animated series Steven Universe and its epilogue series Steven Universe Future.

Early life
Born in Portsmouth, Virginia, Magno Hall is the child of a United States Navy sailor and a nurse, both Filipino-American immigrants. Her father is originally from Baguio, and her mother was raised in Manila. Magno Hall grew up in San Diego, California, and Orlando, Florida.

Career
Magno Hall began acting at a young age, lending her voice to the Disney show The All New Mickey Mouse Club (first recorded in 1988) from 1988-1991, and occasionally in 1992. She also appears as Jasmine on the Disney's Aladdin: A Musical Spectacular soundtrack. She is credited as one of the students in the 1993 film Sister Act 2 and voiced Princess Dinner Guest in a episode of Happily Ever After: Fairy Tales for Every Child.

After The Party, Magno went on to perform in musical theatre, most notable was her role of Kim in the Broadway production of Miss Saigon, a role she later reprised on the national tour. She later played the role of Nessarose on the first national tour of Wicked, from December 12, 2006 until November 16, 2008. She reprised the role in the San Francisco sit-down production at the Orpheum Theatre. Performances began January 27, 2009 with an opening night of February 6, 2009. She played her final performance on September 5, 2010, when the production closed. She joined the ensemble for the US tour of If/Then in October 2015, listed as "Cathy and others" and was the understudy for Elizabeth and Kate. Hall starred in the East West Players production of Next to Normal as Diana Goodman from May 12 to June 18, 2017.

Magno Hall came to wider attention for providing the voice of the character of Pearl on the Cartoon Network program Steven Universe from 2013 to 2019, and the follow-up series Steven Universe Future from 2019 to 2020. She also voiced Pink Pearl, Holopearl, and other characters in both series. Magno Hall provided both the spoken and singing voice for the character, in these two series, Steven Universe: The Movie, video games such as Steven Universe: Attack the Light, Steven Universe: Save the Light, Steven Universe: The Phantom Fable, and Steven Universe: Unleash the Light, and other animated shorts. She also voiced Snuggs in the animated series Doc McStuffins, from 2016 to 2017, and three characters (Dorris, Dominel, and Pyllis) in the video game Epic Seven.

In 2021, Magno Hall voiced multiple characters, specifically Emissary, Vina, and Newscaster, in Trese and two characters in Dogs in Space, Penelope and Elder Shrubdub. She also voiced the character of Rory in Craig of the Creek, two characters in We Baby Bears (Snowball and Fairy #2), Lola Belen in an episode of Firebuds, and Queenie Santos in the video game We Are OFK in 2022. She will voice Miss Deer Teacher in the upcoming animated series, Kiff.

Personal life
Magno Hall is married to Cliffton Hall, who has starred opposite her in both Miss Saigon and Wicked national tours, and as Fiyero in the San Francisco production of Wicked. He also played the role of Dan Goodman alongside her in East West Player's production of Next to Normal. Most recently, they played opposite each other as Donna Sheridan and Sam Carmichael in a Guam production of "Mamma Mia!". They have two sons named Kaeden and Brycen.

Filmography

Live-action

Film

Television

Voice roles

Film

Television

Video games

Theatre

Awards and nominations

References

External links

 
 

American television actresses
Mouseketeers
Living people
American child actresses
American voice actresses
American musical theatre actresses
American actresses of Filipino descent
Place of birth missing (living people)
Actresses from San Diego
21st-century American actresses
20th-century American actresses
Filipino voice actresses
1975 births